Leani Ratri Oktila (born 6 May 1991) is an Indonesian para badminton player. She played each of the three variations of the sport (women's singles, women's doubles, and mixed doubles) at the highest world level.

In 2021, she won the first para-badminton gold medal representing Indonesia in the women's doubles SL3–SU5 event of the 2020 Summer Paralympics alongside Khalimatus Sadiyah. Oktila also won a silver medal in the women's singles event.

Career

Initially, Oktila played badminton as a normal athlete since 8 years old, and she competed in national events starting from 1999. However, Oktila had a motorbike accident in 2011, causing her left leg to shrink. Thus, she decided to move to the disability class.

Awards and nominations

Achievements

Paralympic Games 
Women's singles

Women's doubles

Mixed doubles

World Championships 

Women's singles

Women’s doubles

Mixed doubles

Asian Para Games 

Women's singles

Women’s doubles

Mixed doubles

ASEAN Para Games 

Women's singles

Women's doubles

Mixed doubles

BWF Para Badminton World Circuit (3 titles) 

The BWF Para Badminton World Circuit – Grade 2, Level 1, 2 and 3 tournaments has been sanctioned by the  Badminton World Federation from 2022. 

Women's singles 

Women's doubles

Mixed doubles

International Tournaments (35 titles, 6 runners-up) 

Women's singles 

Women's doubles 

Mixed doubles

References

1991 births
Living people
Indonesian female badminton players
Indonesian para-badminton players
Paralympic badminton players of Indonesia
Badminton players at the 2020 Summer Paralympics
Paralympic gold medalists for Indonesia
Paralympic silver medalists for Indonesia
Paralympic medalists in badminton
Medalists at the 2020 Summer Paralympics
Sportspeople from Riau

Notes

External links
 Leani Ratri Oktila at BWFpara.tournamentsoftware.com